Shararat is a 2002 Hindi-language comedy drama film directed by debutant Gurudev Bhalla, starring Abhishek Bachchan, Hrishitaa Bhatt and Amrish Puri. The film was released on 12 July 2002.

Plot
Rahul Khanna (Abhishek Bachchan) is the only son of wealthy industrialists, who have no time for their son while on the other hand Rahul has nothing but time on his hands and is hell bent upon getting into trouble with the law, such as racing cars with his friends but he gets away with it most of the time by bribing the officer. Eventually his luck runs out one day while stuck in traffic and in a hurry to reach the airport for his flight to America he meddles with the traffic lights turning them all green and causing a number of vehicles to crash. This time the offence is too serious and unable to bribe the officer he is arrested. DCP Bhosle (Om Puri) wants to teach Rahul a lesson but can't think of a way other than making him do time in jail. Neha Sengupta (Hrishitaa Bhatt) inspired by a Bill Clinton newspaper article, comes up with a unique punishment idea for Rahul, community service. The Judge likes this idea and sentences a remorseless Rahul to a senior citizen's home out in the country. Sparks fly when Rahul meets the old residents of the senior citizens' home, as they do not get on very well.

Cast

 Abhishek Bachchan as Rahul Khanna
 Hrishitaa Bhatt as Neha Sengupta
 Amrish Puri as Prajapati
 Helen as Anuradha Mathur
 Tinnu Anand as Saifuddin "Saifu"
 A.K. Hangal as Gajanan Desai
 Dara Singh as Mr. Gujral
 Daisy Irani as Mrs. Chitra Gujral
 Viju Khote as Keshav Deshpande
 Shubha Khote as Shanta Deshpande
 Mohnish Bahl as Vikram Saxena
 Navni Parihar as Advocate Nandini Khanna (Rahul's Mom)
 Romesh Sharma as Niranjan Khanna (Rahul's Dad)
 Ashish Vidyarthi as Arora
 Om Puri as DCP Bhosle
 Anjan Srivastav as the Judge
 Anang Desai as Neha's Dad
 Rajendranath Zutshi as Gajanan's son
 Iravati Harshe as Gajanan's Daughter-in-law
 Yatin Karyekar as Anuradha's son
Javed Khan Amrohi as Traffic Police Constable Pandey
Lilliput as Thief jailed in Police Station Lock Up

Soundtrack
Music was composed by the famous duo Sajid–Wajid. It consists of 8 original songs.

List of tracks : 
 "Dil Kehta Hai" – Sonu Nigam
 "Ek Ladki Mujhe" – Sonu Nigam & Alka Yagnik
 "Kuch Tum Kaho" – Sonu Nigam
 "Mehki Hawaon Mein" – Sonu Nigam & Kay Kay
 "Ye Main Kahan" – Hariharan, Anupama Deshpande, & Sonu Nigam
 "Mastana Albela" – Hariharan
 "Na Kisi Ki Aankh Ka" – Talat Aziz
 "Dil Kehta Hai" – Instrumental

References

External links 

2002 films
2002 comedy-drama films
Indian comedy-drama films
2000s Hindi-language films